Avatti is a village panchayat in Cuddalore district  in the Indian state of Tamil Nadu. It is located on the National Highway NH-45.

Economy
Agriculture is the main source of income.  Most of the young age people work in Singapore.  This has uplifted the quality of life in the village. Some of them work in Bangalore or Chennai as engineers.

Villages in Cuddalore district